The Athens Radio Station was a radio station that began to emit in 1938 in Athens under the auspices of the Metaxas Regime's Radio Broadcast Service (ΥΡΕ). It was based in the premises of the Zappeion in central Athens. It was the forerunner of the eventual National Radio Foundation.

Defunct radio stations in Greece
1938 establishments in Greece
Radio stations established in 1938
Public radio in Greece
Radio stations in Athens